Ouaddaï may refer to:

 Ouaddaï highlands, an area in eastern Chad along the border with Sudan
 Ouaddaï Prefecture, a former political prefecture of Chad
 Ouaddaï Region, a political region of Chad created in 2002
 Wadai Empire (1635–1912), a kingdom located to the east of Lake Chad
 Wadai War (1906-1911), between France and the Wadai Empire